Nicolas Jacobi (born 13 April 1987) is a German professional field hockey player who currently plays as a goalkeeper for Delhi Waveriders in the Hockey India League and the Germany national field hockey team.

Career

Delhi Waveriders
On 16 December 2012, Jacobi was bought by the Delhi Waveriders for the new franchise base league, Hockey India League, for $50,000. He then made his debut for the side on 14 January 2013 in the leagues very first match against the Punjab Warriors. He started the match and played the full game as Delhi Waveriders won 2–1.

International

2012 Olympics
Jacobi was a reserve for the Germany side that won the gold medal at the 2012 Olympics.

References

External links
 
 
 
 
 RRK Profile 

1987 births
Living people
German male field hockey players
Hockey India League players
Delhi Waveriders players
Olympic field hockey players of Germany
Field hockey players at the 2016 Summer Olympics
Olympic medalists in field hockey
Medalists at the 2016 Summer Olympics
Olympic bronze medalists for Germany
German expatriate sportspeople in India
Expatriate field hockey players
Uhlenhorster HC players
Sportspeople from Mainz
2014 Men's Hockey World Cup players
21st-century German people